The map data is for year 2014 from the World Bank. Numbers are in percentage.

Table

The table uses 2014, 2015 and 2018 data from the World Bank. Numbers are as a percentage.

See also

Plotted maps
European countries by electricity consumption per person
European countries by employment in agriculture (% of employed)
European countries by fossil fuel use (% of total energy)
European countries by health expense per person
European countries by military expenditure as a percentage of government expenditure
European countries by percent of population aged 0-14
European countries by percentage of women in national parliaments
List of sovereign states in Europe by life expectancy
List of sovereign states in Europe by number of Internet users

References

External links

Demographics of Europe